The Stanford Institute for Economic Policy Research (SIEPR) is a nonpartisan economic research institution housed at Stanford University.  It was founded in 1982 as a way to bring together economic scholars from different parts of the University. 

SIEPR's mission is to support research that informs economic policymaking while engaging future leaders and scholars. The institute shares knowledge and builds relationships among academics, government officials, the business community and the public.

History
George Shultz was a key player in its inception. The current director of the institute is Mark Duggan; past directors include John Shoven, Michael Boskin, Lawrence J. Lau, and James Sweeney.

References

External links
 

Stanford University independent research
Research institutes established in 1982
1982 establishments in California